Punk Rock Jesus is a six-issue limited series comic book created by Sean Murphy and published by Vertigo comics. The series ran for six issues from September 2012 to January 2013 and was collected as a trade paperback in April 2013.

Background
The first issue was released July 11, 2012. Punk Rock Jesus won the IGN Award for Best Comic Mini-Series of 2012.

Plot
In 2019 an entertainment company named OPHIS (Greek for serpent) starts what's known as the "J2 Project", a plan to resurrect Jesus Christ. A clone of Jesus Christ is made with DNA from the Shroud of Turin. The young Jesus is raised on an island with his entire life dictated and televised and viewed by nearly the entire world. Faced with these stresses the young Jesus ultimately becomes a rebellious punk rocker. Religious zealots either love or hate the show and politicians begin to fret over potential influences on the nation. The scientific community fears the implications of the cloning itself.

Collected editions

See also
Christ Clone Trilogy
I'm Not Jesus Mommy

References

External links
 Punk Rock Jesus at Comic Vine
 

2012 comics debuts
Vertigo Comics limited series
Depictions of Jesus in literature
Comics about cloning
Comics by Sean Murphy
Reality television series parodies
Religious comics
Punk comics
Religion in science fiction